The Portuguese explorer Ferdinand Magellan (1480–1522) is known for leading the first circumnavigation around the earth. A number of things have been named in his honor, including natural phenomenona which he was the first European to observe, such as the Strait of Magellan, and the Magellanic Penguin. In other cases, modern entities (such as NASA's Magellan probe) have been named after Magellan in reference to his navigational skill and exploration of uncharted lands.

Astronomy

Celestial objects

 Magelhaens (Martian crater), named in 1976
 Magelhaens (lunar crater), named in 1935
 The Magellanic Clouds, two irregular dwarf galaxies visible in the southern celestial hemisphere. The diary of Antonio Pigafetta, the chronicler of Magellan's expedition, contains one of the first European descriptions of the clouds. However, referring to them as Magellanic Clouds did not become popular until much later. The first instance of the term recorded in the Oxford English Dictionary is from a 1678 volume of Philosophical Transactions.
 4055 Magellan, an asteroid discovered in 1985

Instruments

 Magellan (spacecraft), a probe launched by NASA in 1989 to map the surface of Venus
 Magellan Telescopes, two large optical telescopes located at Las Campanas Observatory in Chile
 Giant Magellan Telescope an extremely large telescope under construction, also at Las Campanas Observatory, expected to be completed in 2025

Geography

 Strait of Magellan, a passage from the Atlantic to the Pacific Ocean through the southern tip of South America, discovered and crossed by Magellan in 1520. At the time, Magellan referred to it as Estrecho de Todos los Santos (Strait of All Saints), but within seven years, it was being called Estrecho de Magallanes in honor of Magellan.
Magallanes Region, region of Chile
 Magellanica, also known as Terra Australis, a southern continent (incorrectly) hypothesized to exist, appearing on many European maps between the 15th and 18th centuries 
 Magellan Bay on Mactan Island (the site of Magellan's death)
 The name 'Pacific Ocean' was coined by Magellan. Until the eighteenth century, the ocean was also often referred to as the Sea of Magellan

Plants
 Carex magellanica, Tall Bog Sedge or Boreal Bog Sedge 
 Sphagnum magellanicum, Magellan's Peatmoss

Other
 Magellan's Cross, a cross planted by members of Magellan's expedition in the Philippines
 Magellan Shrine, a memorial to Magellan erected in 1886 on Mactan Island
 Magellanic penguin, a South American penguin first described by Antonio Pigafetta on Magellan's expedition
 The Magellan Birdwing (Troides magellanus), a large butterfly found in the Philippines
 Order of Magellan, an award given by the Circumnavigators Club
 Ferdinand Magellan (railcar), a railcar used by US Presidents from 1943 to 1958
 Magellan Navigation, a company producing GPS devices
 CMA CGM Magellan, a container ship
 Project Magellan, also known as Operation Sandblast, the first submarine circumnavigation of the world, undertaken in 1960 by the US Navy
 The Navegantes del Magallanes (Magellan Navigators), a Venezuelan professional baseball team
 The Magellan Billet is a fictitious covert US intelligence agency in the thrillers by American novelist Steve Berry starring Cotton Malone

References

Magellan